Myosin-Ie (Myo1e) is a protein that in humans is encoded by the MYO1E gene.

Myosin-Ie is a long tailed myosin. It contains an N-terminal motor domain, an IQ motif, a TH1 domain containing a plecstrin homology (PH) domain, a proline rich TH2 domain, and an SH3 domain.  

The MYO1E gene was included in several genetic signatures for cancer prognosis.

References

Further reading

External links